The Mahabharat ground skink (Ablepharus mahabharatus) is a species of skink found in Nepal.

References

Ablepharus
Reptiles described in 1998
Taxa named by Valery Konstantinovich Eremchenko
Taxa named by Karan Bahadur Shah
Taxa named by Alexander M. Panfilov